The barber surgeon, one of the most common European medical practitioners of the Middle Ages, was generally charged with caring for soldiers during and after battle. In this era, surgery was seldom conducted by physicians, but instead by barbers, who, possessing razors and coordination indispensable to their trade, were called upon for numerous tasks ranging from cutting hair to amputating limbs.

In this period, surgical mortality was very high due to blood loss and infection. Yet, since doctors thought that blood letting treated illness, barbers also applied leeches. Meanwhile, physicians considered themselves to be above surgery.  Physicians mostly observed surgical patients and offered consulting, but otherwise often chose academia or working in universities.  Some chose to reside in castles, where they treated the wealthy.

Middle Ages in Europe

Due to religious and sanitary monastic regulations, monks had to maintain their tonsure (the traditional baldness on the top of the head of Catholic monks). This created a market for barbers, because each monastery had to train or hire a barber. They would perform bloodletting and other minor surgeries like pulling teeth or creating ointments. The first barber surgeons to be recognized as such worked in monasteries around 1000 AD.

Because physicians performed surgery so rarely, the Middle Ages saw a proliferation of barbers, among other medical "paraprofessionals", including cataract couchers, herniotomists, lithotomists, midwives, and pig gelders. In 1254, Bruno da Longobucco, an Italian physician who wrote on surgery, was concerned about barbers performing phlebotomies and scarifications.

Barbers in France and Italy

In Paris, disputes between doctors led to the widespread patronage of barbers. The College of St. Cosme had two levels of student doctors: doctors who were given a long academic robe were permitted to perform surgeries and doctors who were given a short robe and had to pass a special examination before being given that license. The short-robed doctors were bitter because the long-robed physicians behaved pretentiously.

The short-robed doctors of St. Cosme entered into an agreement with the barber surgeons of Paris that they would offer the barber surgeons secret lessons on human anatomy as long as they swore to be dependents and supporters of the short-robed physicians. This secret deal existed from around the time of the founding of St. Cosme in 1210 until 1499, when the group of surgeon barbers asked for their own cadaver to perform their anatomical demonstrations. From the 1540s in France, the translation into French of the works of ancient authors allowed progress in the transmission of knowledge: barber-surgeons could add to their manual skills, an ancient surgical knowledge confronted with their actual practice.

New problems appeared in war surgery, without equivalent in the past: wounds caused by firearms and mutilations caused by artillery, the barber-surgeon being required to treat all the affections appearing on the surface of the body, the doctor treating those on the inside.

There was already social mobility between surgeons and barber-surgeons. A surgeon's apprenticeship began with the practice of shaving. The young surgeon could thus have a source of income before mastering the surgery of his time. In the context of Renaissance humanism, this practical experience took place outside of academic scholasticism. The action is clearly sanctioned by the results, visible to all. For Michel de Montaigne, compared to medicine, 

In 1660, the barber surgeons eventually recognized the physicians' dominance.

In Italy, barbers were not as common. The Salerno medical school trained physicians to be competent surgeons, as did the schools in Bologna and Padua. In Florence, physicians and surgeons were separated, but the Florentine Statute concerning the Art of Physicians and Pharmacists in 1349 gave barbers an inferior legal status compared to surgeons.

Barbers in the British Isles in the early modern period 

Formal recognition of their skills (in England at least) goes back to 1540, when the Fellowship of Surgeons (who existed as a distinct profession but were not "Doctors/Physicians" for reasons including that, as a trade, they were trained by apprenticeship rather than academically) merged with the Company of Barbers, a London livery company, to form the Company of Barber-Surgeons. However, the trade was gradually put under pressure by the medical profession and in 1745, the surgeons split from the Barbers' Company (which still exists) to form the Company of Surgeons. In 1800 a Royal Charter was granted to this company and the Royal College of Surgeons in London came into being (later it was renamed to cover all of England — equivalent colleges exist for Scotland and Ireland as well as many of the old UK colonies, e.g., Canada).

Traditions in the modern era 
Few traces of barbers' links with the surgical side of the medical profession remain. One is the traditional red and white barber's pole, or a modified instrument from a blacksmith, which is said to represent the blood and bandages associated with their historical role.

Another vestige is the use of the title "Mr" (or Miss, Mrs or Ms) rather than "Dr" by doctors when they complete their surgery qualifications by, for example, the award of an MRCS or FRCS diploma. This tradition is almost exclusive to the United Kingdom, Ireland and to a lesser extent the Commonwealth countries of South Africa, Australia and New Zealand. This practice dates back to the days when surgeons did not require a university education in medicine and this link with the past is retained despite the fact that all surgeons in these countries now require a medical degree as well as several additional years of surgical training and certification. They no longer perform haircuts, a task the barbers have retained.

History 
A barber surgeon was a person who could perform surgical procedures including bloodletting, cupping therapy, pulling teeth and amputation. Barbers could also bathe, cut hair, shave or trim facial hair and give enemas. During wartime, the barber surgeon served in the army but during peacetime he could practice among civilians.

See also
 City physician
Feldsher
 Elinor Sneshell
 List of barbers

References

External links

Medieval occupations
History of surgery
Traditional healthcare occupations